The third round of the women's scratch race of the 2007–08 UCI Track Cycling World Cup Classics took place in Los Angeles, United States on 18 January 2008. 50 cyclists participated in the contest.

Competition format
A scratch race is a race in which all riders start together and the object is simply to be first over the finish line after a certain number of laps. There are no intermediate points or sprints.

The tournament consisted of three qualifying heats of 5 km (20 laps). The top eight cyclist of each heat advanced to the 10 km final (40 laps).

Schedule
Friday 18 January
15:35-16:05 Qualifying
20:45-21:05 Final
21:30-21:35 Victory Ceremony

Schedule from Tissottiming.com

Results

Qualifying

Qualifying Heat 1

Results from Tissottiming.com.

Qualifying Heat 2

Results from Tissottiming.com.

Qualifying Heat 3

Results from Tissottiming.com.

Final

Results from Tissottiming.com.

World Cup Standings
World Cup standings after 3 of 4 2007–08 World Cup races.

Results from Tissottiming.com.

See also
 2007–08 UCI Track Cycling World Cup Classics – Round 3 – Women's individual pursuit
 2007–08 UCI Track Cycling World Cup Classics – Round 3 – Women's points race

References

2007–08 UCI Track Cycling World Cup Classics
2008 in American sports
UCI Track Cycling World Cup – Women's scratch